Calleva is the largest outdoor education organization in Central Maryland, United States, established to provide outdoor team building opportunities for groups such as schools and companies, and to take groups of individuals on excursions throughout Maryland, Virginia, and West Virginia.

History
Calleva was owned by Nick, Alex and Matt Markoff, whose family was involved in the summer camp business for generations. In the fall of 1993, in order to raise capital, they held the first ever Markoff's Haunted Forest. Camp Calleva began in the summer of 1994. In 1998 the first ever Calleva Challenge was held, a triathlon of sorts on the Potomac River. This was later renamed the Potomac Challenge in 1999.

They also offer the Calleva Ski Club during the winter, and the LIT (Leadership in Training) program during the summer.

Locations
Calleva offers programming across four locations including:
Riley's Lock, in Poolesville, Maryland is the hub-location for Camp Calleva. It is adjacent to the Potomac River and the C&O Canal.
Markoff's Farm, a  farm, in Dickerson, Maryland is home to Markoff's Haunted Forest, and CEEP (Calleva Equestrian Educational Programming) horseback riding, and Calleva's agricultural tourism program.
Seneca Barn in Darnestown, Maryland 
Adventure Island, Calleva's private island in the Potomac River.

References

External links
 Calleva

Camping in the United States
Summer camps in Maryland
Summer camps in Virginia
Outdoor education organizations
Educational organizations based in the United States